The East River is a  river entirely within Wakulla County, Florida, draining part of the St. Marks National Wildlife Refuge into the St. Marks River.

A dam within the refuge, crossed by the Florida Trail, creates the  impoundment known as the East River Pool, with a boat ramp allowing access by canoes and small boats. Oyster bars are abundant around the mouth of the river.

During the early 19th century, salt works were established along the East River, and were destroyed by a tropical storm in June 1863. Later during the American Civil War, a small skirmish was fought between Union and Confederate troops along the East River on March 3–5, 1865, resulting in the capture of the East River Bridge by Union forces prior to the Battle of Natural Bridge.

List of crossings

References

 St. Marks National Wildlife Refuge History
 Florida during the Civil War

Rivers of Florida
Rivers of Wakulla County, Florida
Florida in the American Civil War